České Brezovo is a village and municipality in the Poltár District in the Banská Bystrica Region of Slovakia.

History
In historical records, the village was surely mentioned in 1435  (Brezow, Bryzow), but the existence of the village in the area is recorded from 1334 as belonging to Zách, Bosnyák and Szentiványi families. In 1834  based a glasswork in Zlatno settlement.

Culture
In České Brezovo was born Bohuslav Tablic, one of the leaders of Slovak classicism. Village commemorates him with a memory plaque on a public library.

Notable personalities
 František Krňan, mathematician
 Bohuslav Tablic, poet, translator, literary historian

Genealogical resources

The records for genealogical research are available at the state archive "Statny Archiv in Banska Bystrica, Slovakia"

 Lutheran church records (births/marriages/deaths): 1784-1925 (parish A)

See also
 List of municipalities and towns in Slovakia

References

External links
 
 
http://www.statistics.sk/mosmis/eng/run.html
http://www.e-obce.sk/obec/ceskebrezovo/ceske-brezovo.html
Panoramic photos from neighbourhood of České Brezovo
Surnames of living people in Ceske Brezovo

Villages and municipalities in Poltár District